Lanterns is the seventh and final studio album by American metal band 36 Crazyfists. The album was released in the UK on September 29, 2017, and the band promoted it with a tour with DevilDriver and Cane Hill. Music videos were made and released for the singles "Better to Burn" and "Wars to Walk Away From". Vocalist Brock Lindow explained that the writing process helped him get over depression after a divorce from a 13-year marriage, and the results of his writing were "a lot more real and raw this time."

Track listing

References
 Citations

2017 albums
36 Crazyfists albums
Spinefarm Records albums